Open Invitation is the fifth studio album by American singer Tyrese. It was released on November 1, 2011, by his label Voltron Recordz and was distributed by EMI. This became Tyrese's first album released on his label Voltron Recordz since his departure from J Records. The production on the album was handled by multiple producers including David Banner, B.A.M., R. Kelly, Lil' Ronnie, and Swiff D among others. The album also features guest appearances by Rick Ross, Ludacris, T.I., Jay Rock, Big Sean, R. Kelly, Busta Rhymes and Faith Evans.

Open Invitation was supported by two singles: "Stay" and "Too Easy". The album received generally positive reviews from music critics and was a commercial success. It debuted at number nine on the US Billboard 200 chart, selling 76,000 copies in its first week, making it Tyrese's second top 10 album.  At the 55th Grammy Awards, the album received a nomination for Best R&B Album which was presented on February 10, 2013.

Singles 
The album's lead single was "Stay" was released for digital download in the United States on August 16, 2011. The single missed the Billboard Hot 100 chart, but peaked at number 11 on the US Hot R&B/Hip-Hop Songs chart. The album's second single "Too Easy", which features Ludacris, was released for digital download on August 30, 2011. The single peaked at number 38 on the US Hot R&B/Hip-Hop Songs chart dated October 15, 2011. The music video was released on October 12, 2011. The album's third single "Nothing On You" peaked at number 61 on the US Hot R&B/Hip-Hop Songs chart dated June 9, 2012.

Commercial performance 
Open Invitation debuted at number nine on the US Billboard 200 chart, selling 76,000 copies in its first week of release. This became Tyrese's second US top-ten debut on the chart. In the second week, the album dropped to number 18 on the chart, selling an additional 33,000 copies. In its third week, the album dropped to number 28 on the chart, selling 21,000 more copies. As of June 2015, the album has sold 375,000 copies in the United States.

Track listing 

Notes
 signifies a co-producer
 signifies a vocal producer

Charts

Weekly charts

Year-end charts

References 

2011 albums
Tyrese Gibson albums
Albums produced by David Banner